Masters W75 discus world record progression is the progression of world record improvements of the discus W75 division of Masters athletics.  Records must be set in properly conducted, official competitions under the standing IAAF rules unless modified by World Masters Athletics.

The W75 division consists of female athletes who have reached the age of 75 but have not yet reached the age of 80, so exactly from their 75th birthday to the day before their 80th birthday. The W75 division now throws a 0.75 kg implement.  Prior to the 2010 season, W75 threw a 1.0 kg implement.

Key

0.75 kg

1 kg

References

Masters Athletics Discus list

Masters athletics world record progressions
Discus